Richard Rohr,  (born 1943) is an American Franciscan priest and writer on spirituality based in Albuquerque, New Mexico. He was ordained to the priesthood in the Roman Catholic Church in 1970. In 2011, PBS called him "one of the most popular spirituality authors and speakers in the world".

Life and ministry 
Rohr was born in Kansas in 1943. He received his Master of Theology degree in 1970 from the University of Dayton. He entered the Franciscans in 1961 and was ordained to the priesthood in 1970. Rohr founded the New Jerusalem Community in Cincinnati, Ohio, in 1971 and the Center for Action and Contemplation (CAC) in Albuquerque, New Mexico, in 1986, where he serves as founding director and academic dean of the Living School for Action and Contemplation. The curriculum of Rohr's school is founded on seven themes developed by Rohr and explored in his book Yes, And....

In his 2016 book The Divine Dance, Rohr suggests that the top-down hierarchy of western Christianity since Emperor Constantine has held ecumenical traditions back for centuries, and that the future of people of faith will have to involve a bottom-up approach. Rohr maintains what he would call prophetic positions, on the "edge of the inside" of a church that he sees as failing to transform people, and thus increasingly irrelevant. In a critique of Rohr published in the New Oxford Review, Reverend Bryce Sibley writes that Rohr asserts that God holds both the masculine and the feminine together rather than either or binary dualistic thinking and criticizes ecumenical religious rituals that focus on rules rather than the paramount centrality of relationship with God, and neighbor.

In 2000, Rohr publicly endorsed Soulforce, an organization that challenges what it calls religion-based LGBTQ oppression through nonviolent protest. In a 1999 essay, and afterward, Rohr has welcomed and affirmed God's love for LGBTQ people, emphasizing that God asks the same of people in same-sex relationships as of those in heterosexual ones: "truth, faithfulness, and striving to enter into covenants of continuing forgiveness of one another". 

In his teaching on scripture, such as in his book Things Hidden, Rohr calls the biblical record a human account of humanity's evolving experience with God, "the word of God in the words of people". His book Immortal Diamond: The Search for Our True Self suggests Jesus's death and resurrection is an archetypal pattern for the movement from "false self" to "true self", from "who you think you are" to "who you are in God". Rohr's 2014 book Eager to Love explores the key themes of Franciscan spirituality, which he sees as a "third way" between traditional orthodoxy and heresy, a way of focusing on the Gospel, justice, and compassion.

Rohr emphasizes "alternative orthodoxy", a term the Franciscan tradition has applied to itself, referring to a focus on "orthopraxis"—a belief that lifestyle and practice are much more important than mere verbal orthodoxy, which he feels is much overlooked in Catholic preaching today. According to Rohr's teachings, a person does not have to follow Jesus or practice any formal religion to come by salvation, but rather "fall in love with the divine presence, under whatever name". Rohr says people are disillusioned with conservative churches that teach that nonbelievers go to Hell. The Perennial Tradition, or Perennial Philosophy, forms the basis of much of his teaching; his work's essential message focuses on the union of divine reality with all things and the human potential and longing for this union. Rohr and other 21st-century spiritual leaders explore the Perennial Tradition in the Center for Action and Contemplation's issue of the publication Oneing.

In his 2019 book The Universal Christ, Rohr says he is a panentheist. He goes on to state that panentheism is the true position of Jesus and Paul:

Influences on Rohr outside of Christianity include Buddhism and Hinduism, Gandhi, Carl Jung, Spiral Dynamics, the Enneagram of Personality, and Ken Wilber's Integral Theory.

On July 1, 2022, Pope Francis met with Rohr, who said that Francis expressed support for his work. Later that year, Rohr announced he would step back from public ministry following a lymphoma diagnosis. He was previously diagnosed with prostate cancer in 2017, and suffered a severe heart attack in 2018.

Commentary 
According to Douglas Groothuis, professor of philosophy at Denver Seminary, Rohr draws on Eastern mysticism rather than biblical Christianity by preaching to find our "true self" instead of knowing a savior distinct from the self. Groothuis argues that Rohr's fundamental claims about the "universal Christ" and Pantheistic worldview subvert the "biblical worldview with most egregious errors" and that Rohr manipulates the scriptures to support his pantheistic or panentheistic worldview, rather than monotheism. Groothuis argues that Rohr contradicts the Christian doctrine that creation and the creator (God) are different entities with infinite separation. He further says that Rohr's writings parallel New Age christologies which, he says, misread the biblical texts. Groothuis criticizes Rohr's reference to creation as the first incarnation of "the universal Christ", arguing that this contradicts biblical doctrine. Groothuis says that Rohr distorts the gospel since his emanational metaphysics is based on perennial tradition.

Erwin Lutzer, an evangelical pastor, has criticized Rohr for promoting universalism and a New Age spirituality that eschews specific doctrines and basic biblical teaching. Lutzer said that Rohr's book The Divine Dance "is not about the Trinity, but rather Rohr imaginatively uses Trinitarian language in order to give a backdrop to his own eclectic spiritual teaching".

William P. Young, a Christian author, has commented on Rohr's ideas, saying that people who are frustrated with their churches might misread Rohr's works as advocating a vague spirituality disconnected from the orthodox and scriptural understanding of Christ. According to Young, "The danger of universalism is nothing matters, especially Jesus". He adds, "Some of Rohr's followers can read it that way". Rohr has reported that a group of local Catholics secretly recorded his sermons to have him excommunicated. They delivered the tapes to the late Cardinal Joseph Bernardin, then Archbishop of Cincinnati, who reviewed them and determined that they were within the bounds of the Church's teachings.

Published works

Author 
 Wild Man's Journey: Reflections on Male Spirituality (Saint Anthony Messenger Press, 1986; Revised edition 1996)
 Simplicity, Revised & Updated: The Freedom of Letting Go (1991, reissued by Crossroad Publishing Co, U.S.; 2nd New edition of Revised edition, 2004) 
 Near Occasions of Grace (Orbis Books (USA), 1993) 
 Quest for the Grail: Soul Work and the Sacred Journey (1994, reissued by Crossroad Publishing Co, U.S.; New edition, 1997) 
 Jesus' Plan for a New World: The Sermon on the Mount (with J. Feister) (St. Anthony Messenger Press, 1996) 
 Radical Grace: Daily Meditations (edited by John Bookser Feister) (1993, reissued by St. Anthony Messenger Press, 1996) 
 The Good News According to Luke: Spiritual Reflections  (Crossroad Publishing Co, U.S., 1997) 
 Everything Belongs: The Gift of Contemplative Prayer (Crossroad Publishing Co, U.S.; 2nd Revised edition, 2003) 
 Adam's Return: The Five Promises of Male Initiation (Crossroad Publishing Co, U.S., 2004) 
 Soul Brothers: Men in the Bible Speak to Men Today (with art by Louis S. Glanzman) (Orbis Books (USA), 2004) 
 From Wild Man to Wise Man: Reflections on Male Spirituality (with Joseph Martos) (St. Anthony Messenger Press, 2005) 
 Job & the Mystery of Suffering (1996, reissued by Gracewing, 2006) 
 Things Hidden: Scripture as Spirituality (Saint Anthony Messenger Press, 2008) 
 Preparing for Christmas: Daily Meditations for Advent (Franciscan Media, 2008) 
 The Naked Now: Learning to See as the Mystics See (The Crossroad Publishing Company, 2009)  
 Wondrous Encounters: Scripture for Lent (Saint Anthony Messenger Press, 2010) 
 A Lever and a Place to Stand: The Contemplative Stance, the Active Prayer (Paulist Press, 2010)  
 Breathing Under Water: Spirituality and the Twelve Steps (Saint Anthony Messenger Press, 2011) 
 Falling Upward: A Spirituality for the Two Halves of Life (Jossey-Bass, 2011) 
 A Companion Journal to Falling Upward: A Spirituality for the Two Halves of Life (Jossey-Bass, 2013) 
 Immortal Diamond: The Search for Our True Self (Jossey-Bass, 2013)  
 Yes, And...: Daily Meditations (Franciscan Media, 2013) 
 Silent Compassion: Finding God in Contemplation (Franciscan Media, 2014) 
 Eager to Love: The Alternative Way of Francis of Assisi (Franciscan Media, 2014) 
 What the Mystics Know: Seven Pathways to Your Deeper Self (The Crossroad Publishing Company, 2015) 
 A Spring Within Us: Daily Meditations (Center for Action and Contemplation, 2016) 
 The Divine Dance: The Trinity and Your Transformation with Mike Morrell (Whitaker, 2016)  
 Just This: Prompts and Practices for Contemplation (Center for Action and Contemplation, 2017)
 The Universal Christ: How a Forgotten Reality Can Change Everything We See, Hope For and Believe (Convergent Books, 2019) 
 The Wisdom Pattern: Order, Disorder, Reorder (Franciscan Media, 2020)  

Editor
 Why Be Catholic?: Understanding Our Experience and Tradition (with Joseph Martos) (Saint Anthony Messenger Press, 1989) 
 The Enneagram: A Christian Perspective (with Andreas Ebert) (1995, reissued by Crossroad Publishing Co, U.S., 2002) 

 Contributions 
 "Foreword" in Roots of Violence in the U.S. Culture: A Diagnosis Towards Healing by Richard Alain (Blue Dolphin Publishing, 1999) 
 "Foreword" in Meal Stories: The Gospel of Our Lives by Kathleen Casey (Thomas More Association, 2000) 
"Sadness" in The Yale Journal for Humanities in Medicine, (October 11, 2004).
 "The Franciscan Opinion" in Stricken by God? Nonviolent Identification and the Victory of Christ, ed. by Brad Jersak and Michael Hardin (William B. Eerdmans Publishing Co., 2008) )
 Hungry, and You Fed Me: Homilies and Reflections for Cycle C, Jim Knipper, ed. (Clear Faith Publishing, 2012)
 "Shrove Tuesday" in God for Us: Rediscovering the Meaning of Lent and Easter, Greg Pennoyer, ed. (Paraclete Press, 2013) 
 Naked, and You Clothed Me: Homilies and Reflections for Cycle A, Jim Knipper, ed. (Clear Faith Publishing, 2013)
 Sick, and You Cared for Me: Homilies and Reflections for Cycle B, Jim Knipper, ed. (Clear Faith Publishing, 2014)
 "Creation as the Body of God" in Spiritual Ecology: The Cry of the Earth, Llewellyn Vaughan-Lee, ed. (The Golden Sufi Center, 2016) 
 "Foreword" in The Sacred Enneagram'' by Christopher L. Heuertz (Zondervan, 2017)

References

External links

 Center for Action and Contemplation
 

1943 births
Living people
American spiritual writers
20th-century Christian mystics
American Friars Minor
American religious writers
American people of German descent
People from Kansas
American motivational speakers
University of Dayton alumni
New Age writers
Panentheists